FICS may refer to:

 Falkland Islands Community School
 Fellow of the International College of Surgeons
 Free Internet Chess Server, a volunteer-run chess server
 Fellow of the Institution of Chartered Surveyors, until 1946 – now FRICS
 International Federation of Sports Chiropractic

See also
FIC (disambiguation)